Beta-1,4-mannosyl-glycoprotein 4-beta-N-acetylglucosaminyltransferase (N-acetylglucosaminyltransferase III, N-glycosyl-oligosaccharide-glycoprotein N-acetylglucosaminyltransferase III, uridine diphosphoacetylglucosamine-glycopeptide beta4-acetylglucosaminyltransferase III, beta-1,4-mannosyl-glycoprotein beta-1,4-N-acetylglucosaminyltransferase, GnTIII) is an enzyme with systematic name UDP-N-acetyl-D-glucosamine:beta-D-mannosyl-glycoprotein 4-beta-N-acetyl-D-glucosaminyltransferase. This enzyme catalyses the following chemical reaction

 UDP-N-acetyl-D-glucosamine + beta-D-mannosyl-R  UDP + 4-(N-acetyl-beta-D-glucosaminyl)-beta-D-mannosyl-R

R represents the remainder of the N-linked oligosaccharide in the glycoprotein acceptor.

References

External links 
 

EC 2.4.1